The Lidlidda Protected Landscape, also known as the Lidlidda–Banayoyo Protected Landscape, is a protected area of natural springs and surrounding mountain forests in Ilocos Sur on the island of Luzon in the Philippines. It is an important watershed providing the agricultural and household water requirements of the communities in the municipalities of Lidlidda and Banayoyo.

Description
The Lidlidda protected landscape area includes parts of the upland municipalities of Lidlidda and Banayoyo, as well as a small portion of the municipality of San Emilio in Ilocos Sur. It contains several natural springs, waterfalls, rivers, creeks and streams including the Lidlidda and Candon rivers, as well as the Danglas, Cabunao and Laolaoed creeks. Its soil composition is classified as brown sandy loam. The park also includes the  conservation area known as Paraesus Verde (Green Paradise) managed by the local government unit of Lidlidda in Poblacion Norte.

Among the tree species found in the area are teak, molave, raintree, tibig, akleng parang and narra.

The park is accessible via the Santiago–Banayoyo–Lidlidda–San Emilio–Quirino National Road from the main highway of the Manila North Road in Santiago just north of Candon. It can also be accessed from the city of Vigan in the north via the Santa Maria–Burgos Road.

See also
 Libunao Protected Landscape
 Bessang Pass Natural Monument

References

Protected landscapes of the Philippines
Springs of the Philippines
Geography of Ilocos Sur
Landforms of Ilocos Sur
Protected areas established in 1936
1936 establishments in the Philippines